Iambia is a genus of moths of the family Noctuidae. The genus was erected by Francis Walker in 1863.

Species
 Iambia alticola (Laporte, 1973)
 Iambia anormalis (Hampson, 1907)
 Iambia berioi Hacker & Fibiger, 2006
 Iambia brunnea Warren, 1914
 Iambia harmonica (Hampson, 1902)
 Iambia incerta (Rothschild, 1913)
 Iambia inferalis Walker, 1863
 Iambia jansei Berio, 1966
 Iambia japonica Sugi, 1958
 Iambia lyricalis Holloway, 1989
 Iambia melanochlora (Hampson, 1902)
 Iambia nigella Hampson, 1918
 Iambia nocturna (Hampson, 1902)
 Iambia nyctostola (Hampson, 1918)
 Iambia postpallida (Wiltshire, 1977)
 Iambia pulla (Swinhoe, 1885)
 Iambia rufescens (Hampson, 1894)
 Iambia shanica Berio, 1973
 Iambia tessellata (Prout, 1925)
 Iambia thwaitesii (Moore, [1884])
 Iambia transversa (Moore, 1882)
 Iambia unduligera (Butler, 1889)
 Iambia volasira Viette, 1968

References

 Hacker, H. & Fibiger, M. (2006). "Updated list of Micronoctuidae, Noctuidae (s.l.), and Hyblaeidae species of Yemen, collected during three expeditions in 1996, 1998 and 2000, with comments and descriptions of species". Esperiana Buchreihe zur Entomologie. 12: 75-166.

External links
 

Amphipyrinae